Miguel Ardiman Ramírez (born 10 June 1967) is a Chilean football manager and former player who played as a defender. He served as a right back at Deportes Concepción, and as a central defender at O'Higgins, Universidad Católica, Santiago Wanderers, Coquimbo Unido, Deportes Iquique and Fernández Vial. With Universidad Católica he won the international title of the Copa Interamericana in 1993, scoring a goal in extra time in the final. He also won the Copa Chile in 1995 with the same team.

Honours
Universidad Católica
 Copa Interamericana: 1993
 Copa Chile: 1995

References

1967 births
Chilean footballers
Chile international footballers
Association football midfielders
People from Concepción, Chile
Living people